

Commercial banks

Bank of Åland

Co-operative banks (OP-Pohjola Group)

Andelsbanken för Åland

Aland
Banks, Aland
Banks
Aland
Banks, Aland
Banks
Åland